Shem Ochuodho is a Kenyan politician. He represented Rangwe constituency in Homa-Bay County between 1997 and 2002 and later became a computer consultant. He also serves as the chair of Kenya Diaspora Association.

Professional career
He then worked for the Rwandan government in Kigali as ICT consultant for  three years. He was  the ICT Advisor to Rwanda’s Minister of State in charge of Energy and Communications and CEO of the Rwanda Information Technology Authority (RITA) Ochuodho was an ICT adviser to the South Sudan government based in Juba. In 2003, Ochuodho was appointed the MD of the Kenya Pipeline Company.

Political career
He was elected to parliament in 1997 on an NDP ticket beating the late Mrs Phelgona Okundi of KANU. He was the founding convener and secretary of the National Alliance(NA), which gave birth to the National Alliance for Change (NAC), that in turn gave rise to the National Rainbow Coalition (NARC). He ran for the Deputy President in the March 2013 Kenyan Presidential election on a Safina party ticket. He was the running mate to Paul Muite.

Awards
In 2007, Ochuodho was honored with the Kenya Community Abroad (KCA) Award for Excellence for his exemplary efforts in the Information, Communication and Technology industry (ICT).

Publications

He is the author of Dawn of a Rainbow, The Untold Intrigues of Kenya's First Coalition Government (2012).

References 

Living people
Year of birth missing (living people)